Charles Kemble (25 November 1775 – 12 November 1854) was a Welsh-born English actor of a prominent theatre family.

Life

Charles Kemble was one of 13 siblings and the youngest son of English Roman Catholic theatre manager/actor Roger Kemble, and Irish-born  actress Sarah Ward. He was the younger brother of, among others, John Philip Kemble, Stephen Kemble and Sarah Siddons. He was born at Brecon in South Wales. Like his brothers he was raised in his father's Catholic faith, while his sisters were raised in their mother's Protestant faith. He and John Philip were educated at Douai School.

After returning to England in 1792, he obtained a job in the post office, but soon resigned to go on the stage, making his first recorded appearance at Sheffield as Orlando in As You Like It in that year. During the early part of his career as an actor he slowly gained popularity. For a considerable time he played with his brother and sister, chiefly in secondary parts, and received little attention.

His first London appearance was on 21 April 1794, as Malcolm to his brother's Macbeth. Ultimately he won independent fame, especially in such characters as Archer in George Farquhar's The Beaux' Stratagem, Dorincourt in Hannah Cowley's The Belle's Stratagem, Charles Surface and Ranger in Benjamin Hoadley's The Suspicious Husband. His Laërtes and Macduff were as accomplished as his brother's Hamlet and Macbeth. His production of Cymbeline in 1827 inaugurated the trend to historical accuracy in stagings of that play that reached a peak with Henry Irving at the turn of the century.

In comedy he was ably supported by his wife, Marie Therese De Camp, whom he married on 2 July 1806. His visit, with his daughter Fanny, to America during 1832 and 1834, aroused much enthusiasm. The later part of his career was beset by money troubles in connection with his joint proprietorship of Covent Garden theatre.

He formally retired from the stage in December 1836, but his final appearance was on 10 April 1840. From 1836-1840 he held the office of Examiner of Plays. In 1844-45 he gave readings from Shakespeare at Willis's Rooms. Macready regarded his Cassio as incomparable, and summed him up as "a first-rate actor of second-rate parts."

See also
See: Gentleman's Magazine, January 1855, Obituary. Mr. Charles Kemble, Vol. 197, pp. 94–96.
Records of a Girlhood, by Frances Anne Kemble.

Notes

Further reading
 Oxberry, Dramatic Biography (London, 1826)
 Fitzgerald, The Kembles (London, 1871)
 Fanny Kemble, Record of a Girlhood (London, 1878)
 Lane (edited), Charles Kemble's Shakespearean Readings (second edition, London, 1879)
 Matthews, Actors and Actresses of Great Britain and the United States (volume ii, New York, 1886)
 Doran, Annals of the Stage (London, 1888)

External links

Theater Arts Manuscripts: An Inventory of the Collection at the Harry Ransom Center

British male stage actors
18th-century English male actors
19th-century English male actors
English male stage actors
19th-century British male actors
1775 births
1854 deaths
People from Brecon
Burials at Kensal Green Cemetery
Kemble family
Actor-managers